Ocansey is a surname. Notable people with the surname include:

Edmund Nee Ocansey (1913–?), Ghanaian politician
Eric Ocansey (born 1997), Ghanaian footballer
Jacinta Ocansey, Nigerian-Ghanaian stand-up comedian, singer, and actress

Surnames of African origin